Jim O'Regan (23 April 1938 – 15 May 1998) was an Australian cricketer. He played six first-class matches for New South Wales in 1957/58.

See also
 List of New South Wales representative cricketers

References

External links
 

1938 births
1998 deaths
Australian cricketers
New South Wales cricketers
Cricketers from Sydney